Daemyeong is a 1981 South Korean television series starring Kim Dong-hoon, Kim Heung-ki, Seo Young-jin, Won Mi-kyung, Kim Sung-won and Baek Il-sub. It aired on KBS1 from January 5, 1981 until December 28, 1981 every Mondays for 52 episodes.

Cast

Main
Kim Dong-hoon as King Injo
Kim Heung-ki as King Hyojong
Seo Young-jin as King Hyeonjong
Won Mi-kyung as Queen Inseon, King Hyojong's wife and King Hyeonjong's mother.
Kim Sung-won as Chief State Councilor Choi Myung-kil
Baek Il-sub as General Im Kyung-up

Supporting

Peoples in Joseon dynasty
Royal Household
Seo Woo-rim as Queen Inyul, King Injo's first wife and King Hyojong's mother.
Kang Soo-yeon as Queen Jangnyul, King Injo's second wife.
Jo Eun-duk as young Queen Jangnyul
Baek Yoon-sik as Crown Prince Sohyun, King Hyojong's big brother. He is King Injo and Queen Inyul's oldest son.
Lee Min-hee as Crown Princess Consort Kang, Crown Prince Sohyun's wife.
Choi Woo-sung as Grand Prince Inpyung, Crown Prince Sohyeon and King Hyojong's little brother. He is King Injo and Queen Inyul's third son.
Yoon Yoo-sun as Grand Princess Consort Bookchun, Grand Prince Inpyung's wife.

Ministers, nobles and maids
Lee Chi-woo as Kim-Ryoo
Im Dong-jin as Left State Councillor Kim Sang-hun
Nam Sung-woo as Jung Choong-shin
Jeon-Woon as Hong Ik-han
Moon Oh-jang as Lee-Wan
Nam Il-woo as Oh Dal-je
Jang-Yong as Yoon-Jip
Joo-Hyun as General Won Doo-pyo
Kim Soon-chul as Kim Ja-jum
Kim Sung-kyum as Lee Shi-baek
Kim Jin-hae as Jang-Yoo
Hwang Bum-shik as Kim Kyung-jing
Ahn Hyung-shik as Song Shi-yul
Kim Shi-won as a Military officer in Pyongyang Fortress
Lee Soon-jae as Left State Councillor Nam Yi-woong
Yoon Duk-yong as Park-Ro
Yang Young-joon as Hong Su-bong
Moon Chang-kil as Jung Noe-kyung
Park Moon-sup as Park Bae-won
Park Yong-shik as Jo-Yang
Song Hee-nam as Shin Jin-ik
Jang Soon-kook as Jang Sa-min
Kang Min-ho as Kang Koon-kwan
Choi Jung-hoon as Kong Ma-kak
Sa Mi-ja as Ha Joong-wol
Lee Kyung-jin as Ok-Hwa
Seonu Eun-sook as Keum-Nyeo
Seo Seung-hee as Mae-Hwan
Ha Mi-hye as young Mae-Hwan
Kim Mi-young as Song-Hwa
Kwon Ki-sun as Yang Hwa-dang
Lee Dae-ro as Lee Kyung-suk
Song Chang-shin as Kim-Yook
Lee Jong-man as Eunuch Kim
Park Hyun-jung as Court Lady Park
Lee Sung-woong as a Buddhist in Dokbo
Go Kwang-woo as a Military officer
Nam Yoon-jung as an Officer (참판)

Peoples in Qing dynasty
Kim Yoon-hyung as Emperor Soongduk (숭덕제; Sungdeokje)
Im Byung-ki as Imperial Prince Junghun (정헌친왕; Jeongheonchinwang), Emperor Soongduk's half nephew.
Yoo Jong-keun as Imperial Prince Yechoong (예충친왕; Yechungchinwang), Emperor Soongduk's half little brother.
Lee-Young as Tatara Inggūldai (용골대; Yonggoldae)
Lee Shin-jae as an officer (예부상서; Yebusangseo)
Maeng Ho-rim
Lee Han-soo
Ha Dae-kyung as a horseman
Kim Yoo-haeng as Wang Jang-soo
Joo Sun-tae as Wang-Choong
Heo Wook-sook as Lady Jin
Seonu Yong-nyu as Lady Yoo

Peoples in Ming dynasty
Seo Young-jin as Emperor Soongjung
Lee Keun-hee as Great King Joo Yoo-soong
Lee Yil-woong as Jung Myung-soo

Other
Park Kyoo-shik
Jung Rae-hyup
Kim Hae-kwon
Lee Seung-ho
Yoo Soon-chul
Kwak Kyung-hwan
Jung Hae-chang
Park Jung-woong
Choi Myung-soo
Min Ji-hwan
Park Byung-ho
Min-Wook
Kim In-tae
Kim Jong-kyul
Hong Young-ja
Ahn Hae-sook
Kim Bong-keun
Jang Hak-soo
Seo Sang-ik
Kim Nan-young
Park Young-mok
Nam Sung-shik
Jung Woon-yong
Park Hae-sang
Jo Jae-hoon
Song Jong-won
Ki Jung-soo
Kang Tae-ki
Kim Byung-ki
Ahn Byung-kyung
Yoo Dong-keun
Ji Mi-ok
Lee Duk-hee
Jung Jong-joon
Chou Seung-chul
Song Bo-young
Song Dong-sup
Song Suk-ho
Choi Sang-il
Oh Joong-hoon

Episodes

References

Korean Broadcasting System television dramas
South Korean historical television series
Television series set in the Joseon dynasty
1981 South Korean television series debuts
1981 South Korean television series endings